Remigio is a surname. Notable people with the surname include:

Carmela Remigio (born 1973), Italian operatic soprano
Porfirio Remigio (born 1939), Mexican cyclist

See also
Remigio (given name)